Clive Brown (15 May 1934 – 11 November 2009) was  a former Australian rules footballer who played with Geelong in the Victorian Football League (VFL).

Notes

External links 
		

1934 births
2009 deaths
Australian rules footballers from Victoria (Australia)
Geelong Football Club players
Eaglehawk Football Club players